Long Run is a tributary of Elk Run in Sullivan County, Pennsylvania, in the United States. It has no named tributaries, but four unnamed tributaries. The stream is considered by the Pennsylvania Department of Environmental Protection to be impaired by atmospheric deposition and metals. Wisconsinan Bouldery Till, Wisconsinan Till, and bedrock consisting of sandstone and shale occur in the vicinity of it.

Course
Long Run begins at the top of a deep valley in Davidson Township. It flows south for several tenths of a mile, receiving two unnamed tributaries from the left. The stream then turns south-southwest and its valley becomes considerably deeper. It then turns south for more than a mile, receiving two more unnamed tributaries from the left. The stream then turns southwest, exits its valley, and reaches its confluence with Elk Run near the border between Sullivan County and Columbia County.

Hydrology
Long Run is considered to be impaired by atmospheric deposition and metals. This is approximately 10.5 percent of all the impaired streams in the watersheds of West Branch Fishing Creek and East Branch Fishing Creek.

Long Run does not attain the stream standards of the Pennsylvania Department of Environmental Protection. None of its four unnamed tributaries attain the standards either.

Geography and geology

Most of the valley of Long Run is on a glacial or resedimented till known as the Wisconsinan Bouldery Till. This till contains numerous boulders consisting of sandstone, quartz, and conglomerate. The rest of the stream's valley, as well as the slopes of the valley, are on bedrock consisting of shale and sandstone. A till known as the Wisconsinan Till occurs near the headwaters of the stream.

Watershed
The stream is entirely within the United States Geological Survey quadrangle of Elk Grove.

Long Run is one of twenty streams in the Upper Susquehanna-Lackawanna drainage basin whose streambed is publicly owned. The streambeds of the two other named tributaries of Elk Run (Hog Run and Gallows Run) are also publicly owned, as is the streambed of Elk Run itself.

History
Long Run was entered into the Geographic Names Information System on August 2, 1979. Its identifier in the Geographic Names Information System is 1179887.

See also
Hog Run, next tributary of Elk Run going upstream
List of tributaries of Fishing Creek (North Branch Susquehanna River)

References

Rivers of Sullivan County, Pennsylvania
Tributaries of Fishing Creek (North Branch Susquehanna River)
Rivers of Pennsylvania